BBC South West is the BBC English Region serving Cornwall, Devon, Isles of Scilly, West Somerset, West Dorset and Channel Islands.

Services

Television
BBC South West'''s television service (broadcast on BBC One South West) consists of the flagship regional news service Spotlight, the opt-out service BBC Channel Islands,  and a 20-minute opt-out during Sunday Politics.

BBC South West covers Cornwall, Channel Islands, Devon, West Dorset & West Somerset

Due to the size of West Dorset, the Listenership of BBC Radio Solent has both covered by BBC South and BBC South West.

Radio
The region is the controlling centre for BBC Radio Devon, BBC Radio Cornwall, BBC Radio Somerset, BBC Radio Jersey and BBC Radio Guernsey.

On weekdays, the five stations carry local programming between 5am and 7pm before joining together for networked programming between 7pm and closedown at 1am. Weekend evening programmes are also simulcast with stations in the BBC West region.

Online and InteractiveBBC South West also produces regional news & local radio pages for BBC Red Button and BBC Local websites for each county.

History

Television
BBC South West began a regional television service on 20 April 1961 (nine days before the first broadcast of the rival ITV station, Westward Television) with ten-minute news bulletins on weekdays, originally presented by Tom Salmon. A year later, the bulletin was expanded and relaunched as the news magazine programme South West at Six (hosted by Sheila Tracy) before being renamed again on 30 September 1963 as Spotlight South West.

An opt-out for the Channel Islands was introduced during the 1990s, beginning with short bulletins after the Nine O'Clock News on weeknights, presented from a small studio at the Frémont Point transmitter. The service was expanded on 16 October 2000 and now incorporates the first half of Spotlight's main 6:30pm programme (under the name BBC Channel Islands News) and the full late bulletin after the BBC News at Ten on weeknights. The service is now based at the studios of BBC Radio Jersey in St Helier.

Following the merger of Westcountry and HTV West to become ITV West & Westcountry in February 2009 (later becoming "ITV West Country" on 1 January 2014), Spotlight is now the only regional TV news service dedicated entirely to, and produced in, the South West, as the ITV service (ITV News West Country) is based in Bristol with bulletins and opt-outs for the region. ITV Channel Television continues to produce and broadcast its own dedicated local news service for the Channel Islands from its studios near St Helier in Jersey.

Studios

The regional headquarters and television centre is at Broadcasting House in the Mannamead area of Plymouth, with offices and television studios also in St Helier, Taunton, Truro and Exeter.

The Plymouth studios were originally a Victorian villa on Seymour Road called Ingledene before being bought by the BBC following the Second World War and subsequently fitted out with technical facilities. A new colour television studio was added to the complex in 1974, allowing Spotlight'' to broadcast in colour for the first time. The studios were due to close in late 2011, with BBC South West moving to a new purpose-built broadcasting centre on the banks of Sutton Harbour, opposite the Barbican in Plymouth city centre. The move stalled, however, due to a developer pulling out of the project and the effect of the recession on the construction industry. In late 2012, the owner of the harbour expressed fears the move may never happen and admitted other parties had expressed an interest in moving to the site earmarked for the BBC. In 2013, the BBC confirmed it would not be moving to Sutton Harbour, but instead be refurbishing its existing Plymouth headquarters. The studios in St Helier, Jersey are used for the opt out Channel Islands news bulletins.

See also

BBC English Regions
BBC Radio Devon
BBC Radio Cornwall
BBC Radio Jersey
BBC Radio Guernsey 
BBC Radio Somerset
BBC Radio Solent

References

External links

South West
Mass media in Cornwall
Mass media in Dorset
Mass media in Guernsey
Mass media in Jersey
Mass media in Plymouth, Devon
Mass media in Somerset
Television channels and stations established in 1954